Genetics (from Ancient Greek  , “genite” and that from  , “origin”), a discipline of biology, is the science of heredity and variation in living organisms.

Articles (arranged alphabetically) related to genetics include:


#

A

B

C

D

E

F

G

H

I

J

K

L

M

N

O

P

Q

R

S

T

U

V

W

X

Y

Z

References

See also 
 List of genetics research organizations
 List of geneticists & biochemists

 Articles
Genetics-related topics
Biotechnology